Rochester Township is one of ten townships in Andrew County, Missouri, United States. As of the 2010 census, its population was 1,182.

Geography

The stream of Niagara Creek runs through this township.

References

 USGS Geographic Names Information System (GNIS)

External links
 US-Counties.com
 City-Data.com

Townships in Andrew County, Missouri
Townships in Missouri